Alana McLaughlin (born in 1983)  is a former member of the U.S. Army Special Forces and current MMA fighter. She has a professional record of 1-0-0, having made her debut fight in Miami at Combate Global on September 10, 2021. She is the second openly trans woman to have fought professionally in MMA.

Early life 
McLaughlin grew up in West Columbia, South Carolina in a conservative family that frequently tried to make her more masculine and sent her to conversion therapy. McLaughlin was not allowed to play sports until her junior year of high school, at which point she joined the cross-country team. In her final two years of high school, McLaughlin performed well enough to receive a scholarship to Newberry College, where she ran for two years before transferring to Winthrop University. While attending Winthrop, McLaughlin had her final conversation with her mother, who made clear she would rather her child die at war than live as her daughter.

McLaughlin finished her degree in fine arts in 2015 at UNC-Asheville.

Special Forces 
McLaughlin joined the U.S. Army Special Forces in 2003 at the age of 20. By 2007, she was a medical sergeant deployed to Afghanistan as part of a 12-person unit. After six years of service, McLaughlin chose not to re-enlist.

McLaughlin earned eight distinguished service medals throughout her career.

Mixed martial arts career 
McLaughlin had her professional debut on September 10, 2021, at Combate Global against Celine Provost. Fighting under the name Lady Feral, McLaughlin won the fight by rear-naked choke in the second round, giving her a professional record of 1-0-0. McLaughlin trained with MMA Masters, a gym in Hialeah, Florida, prior to the bout.

McLaughlin is the second openly transgender woman to fight professionally in MMA, the first being Fallon Fox who last fought in 2014.

References 

Transgender women
People from North, South Carolina
1983 births
Living people
Transgender military personnel
Winthrop University alumni
United States Army personnel of the War in Afghanistan (2001–2021)
LGBT mixed martial artists
Transgender sportswomen
Newberry College alumni